Since You've Been Gone is the second single from American R&B boy-band Day26's debut album. The song was produced by Bryan-Michael Cox. Willie Taylor, Brian Angel, Robert Curry, and Big Mike share lead vocals.

Music video
The video was directed by Erik White and takes place in a hotel. It begins with the group entering the hotel and on top of the roof of the hotel in the daytime. The first solo scene is Willie on a couch in his hotel room singing a verse with a chain in his hand which was from his ex-girlfriend. The chorus takes place on the roof and the lobby of the hotel where they are all singing together. The second solo scene contains Brian in a vacant bar with only the bartender. In Qwanell's solo scene he is on his bed where Dawn Richard of Danity Kane plays his love interest. She is behind him rubbing him and teasing him. The last verse is where Robert is inside his hotel room playing the piano by himself. Lastly, Mike is sitting beside a pool where his ex is in the pool. The video continues with the group on the roof of the hotel but it is now nighttime. The video ends with the group coming off the elevator and seeing their ex-girlfriends. The video premiered on June 27, 2008 on FNMTV. It was added on YouTube on June 27, 2008 and has so far received over 500,000 views.

Charts
The single made some progress on the Hot R&B/Hip Hop Singles chart peaking at number 52 but was still 22 places lower than the group's debut single Got Me Going. The song also failed to enter the Billboard Hot 100 or the Bubbling Under Hot 100 charts.

References

2008 singles
Bad Boy Records singles
Songs written by Adonis Shropshire
Songs written by Bryan-Michael Cox
2008 songs